In quantum chromodynamics (QCD), the gluon condensate is a non-perturbative property of the QCD vacuum which could be partly responsible for giving masses to light mesons.

If the gluon field tensor is represented as Gμν, then the gluon condensate is the vacuum expectation value . It is not clear yet whether this condensate is related to any of the known phase changes in quark matter. There have been scattered studies of other types of gluon condensates, involving a different number of gluon fields.

For more on the context in which this quantity occurs, see the article on the QCD vacuum.

See also
Quantum chromodynamics
QCD vacuum and chiral condensates
Vacuum in quantum field theory
Quark–gluon plasma
QCD matter

References

Quantum chromodynamics
Quark matter